Jörg Michael Pilawa (born 7 September 1965, in Hamburg) is a German television presenter.

Life
Pilawa studied after his school at Gymnasium Hummelsbüttel first medicine and then history, but he did not finish his university studies. From 1987 to 1994 Pilawa worked for Radio Schleswig-Holstein. From 1994 to 1996 Pilawa worked for German television broadcaster ProSieben and since 1996 he worked for television broadcaster SAT1. Since 2001 he worked for German broadcaster ARD and after nine years he changed to German broadcaster ZDF. Pilawa is married and has three children.

Filmography 
Germany in the Eurovision Song Contest 2004, host
Rette Die Million, host
It's Your Chance of a Lifetime, host

Bibliography 
 (with Tilmann Bendikowski) Pilawas Zeitreise : Rätselhaftes und Überraschendes aus unserer Geschichte. Köln : Kiepenheuer & Witsch, 2007.

Awards
2016: Goldene Kamera in category Best TV Entertainment

External links
Official website by Jörg Pilawa
Hamburger Abendblatt:Jörg Pilawa sehnt sich nach Langeweile (German)

German television personalities
German game show hosts
People from Bergedorf
1965 births
Living people
ARD (broadcaster) people
ZDF people
Norddeutscher Rundfunk people